George of Mecklenburg  may refer to:

 Duke George Augustus of Mecklenburg (1748–1785) 
 George, Grand Duke of Mecklenburg-Strelitz (1779–1860) 
 George, Duke of Mecklenburg (1899–1963) 
 Georg Alexander, Duke of Mecklenburg (1921–1996)